Heliozela resplendella is a moth of the Heliozelidae family. It is found from Fennoscandia and northern Russia to the Pyrenees, Alps and Romania and from Ireland to the Baltic region.

The wingspan is 5–7 mm. Head dark bronzy. Forewings dark greyish-bronze ; a white dorsal spot towards base, and another beyond middle. Hindwings rather dark brassy grey.

Adults are on wing from late May to July in one generation per year.

The larvae feed on Alnus glutinosa, Alnus glutinosa x incana and Alnus incana. They mine the leaves of their host plant. The mine starts in a heavy leaf vein. The larva bores in the vein, descending towards the midrib. The larva may move from one thick vein to another with a thin transverse corridor. From the midrib, the larva descends into the petiole. Finally, the larva returns to the leaf through the midrib. Here, it makes a short, full depth, widening corridor with a clear central frass line. Larvae can be found from June and July to October. When full-grown, they cut out an oval case, in which they descend to the ground to pupate.

References

Moths described in 1851
Heliozelidae
Moths of Europe
Taxa named by Henry Tibbats Stainton